Emiliya Serafimova (born ) is a Bulgarian female former volleyball player.

She was part of the Bulgaria women's national volleyball team. She competed at the 2001 Women's European Volleyball Championship.

References

1976 births
Living people
Bulgarian women's volleyball players
Place of birth missing (living people)